Defending champions Jonas Björkman and Max Mirnyi defeated Bob and Mike Bryan in a rematch of the previous year's final, 6–7(7–5), 6–4, 7–5 to win the men's doubles tennis title at the 2006 French Open. It was Björkman's ninth and final major title.

Schedule

Seeds 

Only six seeds made it past the second round.

Draw

Finals

Top half

Section 1

Section 2

Bottom half

Section 3

Section 4

External links
Main Draw
2006 French Open – Men's draws and results at the International Tennis Federation

Men's Doubles
French Open by year – Men's doubles
French Open